The 2011–12 Valparaiso Crusaders men's basketball team represented the Valparaiso University in the 2011–12 NCAA Division I men's basketball season. Their head coach was Bryce Drew. The Crusaders played their home games at the Athletics–Recreation Center and are members of the Horizon League. The Crusaders were Horizon League regular season champions but failed to win the Horizon League Basketball tournament. As regular season champions, they received an automatic bid into the 2012 NIT where they lost in the first round.

Roster

Schedule

|-
!colspan=9| Exhibition

|-
!colspan=9| Regular season

|-
!colspan=12|Horizon League tournament

|-
!colspan=9| 2012 NIT

References

Valparaiso Crusaders
Valparaiso Beacons men's basketball seasons
Valparaiso
Valparaiso Crusaders men's basket
Valparaiso Crusaders men's basket